Dirk Kennedy (born June 15, 1969) resides in New York City and is an American musician.

Kennedy sang for the band Anthrax in its formative stages when they were merely a garage band. He was a freshman in high school and was friends with a school mate of Scott Ian's then girlfriend Marge Ginsberg. Persuaded to sing with the band after hearing him mimic Ronnie James Dio it lasted a few months.  In 1985 he answered an ad in "The Music Paper" and became the lead vocalist for the band Hittman. They released two albums through SPV/Steamhammer records "Hittman" in 1989 and "Vivas Machina" in 1993. Both albums were critically acclaimed. The band was featured on the covers of Kerrang! (getting a near perfect KKKK 1/2) and many other international rock magazines herald them as the next force in Hard rock. After the 1993/94 tour for "Vivas Machina" the band went into hiatus. Never officially disbanding Hittman, Dirk retreated into his home studio to explore other sides of his voice and music. Dirk is a lifelong vegetarian and animal rights advocate.

Kennedy resides in New York City and has been working for years on his solo album "Life is Now", to be officially released on July 12, 2011. The album had been fully completed for some time but its release delayed. The intentional delay is from his ongoing insecurities of where his music fits in today's changing musical landscape. A fan of artists like "Kate Bush, Peter Gabriel and Queen" Dirk has long worried that an album artist in the current disposable pop market might get overlooked or worse, ignored. Reports on the album describe it as a multi-layered work of varying styles and complex harmony. A somewhat reclusive character, he reportedly left the music business out of frustration with industry politics. On April 25, 2009, Dirk was to perform with the reunited original line-up of Hittman, as co-headliners at the Keep It True Festival in Lauda-Konigshoefen Germany. The appearance was cancelled due to a personal matter involving one of Hittman's band members. In August 2009 Dirk began rehearsals with his new band, working out the live show that will coincide with the release of "Life Is Now". On May 22, 2010, Dirk played an unpublicized "Secret Show" at the Vernon Rocks Festival. The 45 minute set included eight songs from "Life Is Now". His band consists of Jai Es (drums), Khalid Superstar (lead guitars), Russ Tyler (bass), Xino Siu (guitar), Ivo Antanasov (keyboards), Kelly Ingrim (backup vocals). 
The Album "Life Is Now" was officially released worldwide on July 12, 2011.

The "Life Is Now" official album release concert was performed to a sold-out crowd on July 15, 2011, at the Foundry, Long Island City, New York. The band played the entire "Life Is Now" album.

References

External links
MySpace site
the Hittman profile

1969 births
Living people
American heavy metal musicians
Anthrax (American band) members
People from New York City